Huyyeh (also Romanized as Hūyyeh and Hūyeh) is a village in Zazeran Rural District, in the Central District of Falavarjan County, Isfahan Province, Iran. At the 2006 census, its population was 2,698, in 716 families.

References 

Populated places in Falavarjan County